Phacelia parryi is a species of phacelia known by the common name Parry's phacelia.

Distribution
It is native to southern California and Baja California, where it grows in coastal and inland mountain ranges and deserts. Its range may extend into Arizona. It grows in many types of local habitat, such as coastal sage scrub, chaparral, and open, recently burned slopes.

Description
Phacelia parryi is an annual herb growing a mostly erect stem 10 to 70 centimeters long. It is glandular and coated in soft and stiff hairs. The leaves are up to 12 centimeters long with toothed oval blades borne on petioles.

The inflorescence is a cyme of widely bell-shaped flowers each 1 to 2 centimeters long. The flower is purple in color, sometimes with pale coloration in the throat, and an arrangement of five white spots. The five protruding stamens are hairy and tipped with white anthers.

See also
California chaparral and woodlands 
California coastal sage and chaparral ecoregion

External links
Jepson Manual Treatment
Photo gallery

parryi
Flora of Baja California
Flora of the California desert regions
Flora of the Sonoran Deserts
Natural history of the California Coast Ranges
Natural history of the Mojave Desert
Plants described in 1859
Flora without expected TNC conservation status